Fulbaria Railway Station is a defunct railway station in Bangladesh which was located in Dhaka. It was the central railway station of Bangladesh (then East Pakistan) before Kamalapur railway station came into operation. The station was closed when trains started running at the new station from 1 May 1968.

History 

In 1885, Dacca State railway built Narayanganj–Bahadurabad Ghat line and opened its part for train service from Dacca (now Old Dhaka) to Narayanganj. In that time Fulbaria railway station was built with other facilities. It was established on the south side of the then main city of Dacca. In the same year, railway connections from Dhaka to Narayanganj and Dhaka to Mymensingh were established. After the partition of India in 1947, Dhaka became the main city and capital of East Bengal. Then the area of Fulbaria became densely populated which became a major obstacle for train movement. As a result, it is was planned to move this station. Later, in the late 1950s, the construction of the new central railway station for the province and a new railway line was started on a large scale in the Kamalapur, Shahjahanpur area of Dhaka and it was completed in 1968.

Earlier, the railway used to go straight from Tejgaon railway station to Fulbaria. Due to the opening of Kamalapur station, the railway line was shifted from Tejgaon. From Tejgaon the line took a left to Kamalapur. As a result the earlier Fulbaria–Tejgaon line was abandoned. Later the line was removed and a road was built in the same place. On the other hand, all the structures of Fulbaria station were also removed. At present, there are bus counters of BRTC, shops, runways etc.

Structure 
Fulbaria railway station had a station house and three lines in front of it. The station belonged to the metre-gauge railway. Although the station was named Fulbaria, the nameplates at both ends of the platform were inscribed with "Dacca", as the station was officially operated as "Dacca Railway Station". The same rule was later applied to Kamalapur railway station.

Ticket selling point 
In 2019, train tickets were sold from this station building on the occasion of Eid. Two years later the counter was shifted from the building after it was demolished.

References

External link 
 

Old Dhaka
History of Dhaka
Demolished railway stations
Railway stations in Dhaka District
Railway stations opened in 1895
Railway stations closed in 1968
1895 establishments in British India
History of rail transport in India
1968 disestablishments in East Pakistan
Former railway stations in Bangladesh